Kathleen Allais (born 19 September 1975) is a French former freestyle skier. She competed in the women's moguls event at the 2002 Winter Olympics.

References

External links
 

1975 births
Living people
French female freestyle skiers
Olympic freestyle skiers of France
Freestyle skiers at the 2002 Winter Olympics
People from Antibes
Sportspeople from Alpes-Maritimes
21st-century French women